Amanda Coetzer won in the final 2–6, 6–1, 6–2 against Elena Dementieva.

Seeds
A champion seed is indicated in bold text while text in italics indicates the round in which that seed was eliminated. The top two seeds received a bye to the second round.

  Amanda Coetzer (champion)
  Elena Dementieva (final)
  Sandrine Testud (second round)
  Paola Suárez (semifinals)
  Silvia Farina Elia (first round)
  Corina Morariu (quarterfinals)
  Ángeles Montolio (quarterfinals)
  Tathiana Garbin (first round)

Draw

Final

Section 1

Section 2

Qualifying

Qualifying seeds

Qualifiers

Qualifying draw

First qualifier

Second qualifier

Third qualifier

Fourth qualifier

References
 2001 Abierto Mexicano Pegaso Draw (International Tennis Federation)

Women's Singles
2001 WTA Tour